"This City" is a song by Australian recording artist Sam Fischer. The song was recorded in 2017 and was released on 18 January 2019 as the third and final single from Fischer's debut EP Not a Hobby. Fisher said "I wrote this with James Michael Robbins and Jackson Morgan on a day when I felt pretty damn defeated by LA. Change is really hard, but so important. This is my experience, one that almost everyone goes through, hope it helps in some way."

After signing with RCA Records in 2019, the song was re-released on 13 December 2019 as the first single from Fischer's third EP Homework.

Background and composition
Fischer wrote "This City" in 2016 and it was released in early 2018 where it was shared by people including Meghan Trainor and Lewis Capaldi. In 2020 Fischer reflects saying "The song got a lot of eyes on it, but it wasn't getting any love from anyone for a long time except for the fans. When I say anyone, I mean Spotify, Apple, Amazon. But it was a fan-favourite."

18 months later, it was featured on TikTok and as Fischer says "It changed everything for me". The exposure lead to Fischer receiving a DM from RCA Records UK which lead to the signing.

Track listings

Charts

Weekly charts

Year-end charts

Certifications

Release history

References

2016 songs
2018 singles
2019 singles
Sam Fischer songs
RCA Records singles
Sony Music singles
Songs about cities
Songs about loneliness
Songs written by Jimmy Robbins
Songs written by Sam Fischer